Horsey is a village and civil parish in the English county of Norfolk within The Broads national park.
At the 2011 Census the population remained less than 100 and was included in the civil parish of Sea Palling.
For the purposes of local government, it falls within the district of North Norfolk.

The villages name means 'Horse island'.

It is situated at the end of Horsey Mere, a nature reserve.

Horsey Windpump is the youngest Windpump in the Broads having been built by Dan England in 1912 and is in the care of the National Trust. It was struck by lightning in 1943 and ceased working at this time. Having succumbed to the elements and ravages of time, a major restoration project to replace the sails began in 2016, and the new sails first turned again in May 2019.  The longer ambition is to have it restored to full working order. The tea room and Windpump is open from March until October but the wider estate is open all year.

Horsey has often taken the brunt of devastating floods and violent coastal storms and, on some notable occasions, the sea has entered the Broads, rendering the water salty and killing large numbers of wildlife. The 18th century owner of Horsey, Sir Berney Brograve, by reviving a previous Act of Parliament, unsuccessfully tried to have the sea breaches repaired after many destructive inundations of his estate.

The church of Horsey All Saints is one of 124 existing round-tower churches in Norfolk.

The coast next to the village, known as Horsey Dunes, is a major wildlife site. During the months of November to January, a colony of Grey Seals heads on to the beach to give birth to seal pups. Creating a beautiful local attraction for many wildlife enthusiasts.

Further reading

Notes 

http://kepn.nottingham.ac.uk/map/place/Norfolk/Horsey

External links

Village website
 
All Saints on the European Round Tower Churches Website
Tour Norfolk - Horsey
Photos and Information about the Seals at Horsey

Villages in Norfolk
Civil parishes in Norfolk
Beaches of Norfolk
North Norfolk